The 2012 JK Racing Asia Series season was the ninth season of the former Formula BMW Pacific series, and the second under its new name of the JK Racing Asia Series. The championship began on 27 May at Sepang and finished on 28 October in New Delhi after sixteen races held at five meetings.

Teams and drivers
 All cars were BMW-engined Mygale FB02 chassis. Guest drivers in italics.

Race calendar and results
The series schedule was released on 2 February 2012. The series visited European circuits for the first time, adding races at Le Castellet and Spa-Francorchamps.

Championship standings
Points were awarded as follows:

References

External links
 Asian Festival Of Speed

JK Racing Asia Series season
JK Racing Asia Series season
JK Racing Asia Series seasons
JK Racing Asia Series